Harold Anthony Collins (May 21, 1925 – November 10, 2015) was a Canadian politician. He represented the electoral district of Gander in the Newfoundland and Labrador House of Assembly from 1967 to 1979. He was a member of the Progressive Conservative Party of Newfoundland and Labrador. Collins was born at Indian Islands, Newfoundland. He married Joan Peckford in 1949 and has ten children. Collins died in 2015 at the age of 90.

References

1925 births
2015 deaths
Progressive Conservative Party of Newfoundland and Labrador MHAs